Arayış (Turkish: Search) was a weekly Turkish language political magazine that existed between 1981 and 1982. The magazine is known for its founder and editor, Bülent Ecevit, a Turkish politician who served as the prime minister of Turkey in addition to his other significant posts. The establishment of the magazine was announced by The New York Times stating that Bülent Ecevit had begun to involve in journalism after long years.

History and profile
Arayış was started as a weekly publication in Ankara by Bülent Ecevit following the 1980 military coup after which political parties were closed, including the Republican People's Party led by him. Its first issue appeared on 21 February 1981. The publisher and editor-in-chief of Arayış was Necdet Onur. The primary function of the magazine was to publish Ecevit's views on political, economic and social situations in Turkey. In fact, Ecevit's writings in Arayış laid the basis of his new political party, namely Democratic Left Party.

Arayış was temporarily banned on 4 April 1981. Although the magazine resumed publication soon and sold 100,000 copies in June 1981, Ecevit was banned from publishing articles in Arayış from the 15th issue. The magazine produced a total of 54 issues before it was shut down by the military government on 2 March 1982.

References

1981 establishments in Turkey
1982 disestablishments in Turkey
Banned magazines
Censorship in Turkey
Defunct political magazines published in Turkey
Magazines established in 1981
Magazines disestablished in 1982
Magazines published in Ankara
Turkish-language magazines
Weekly magazines published in Turkey